Alex Paul Menon is an Indian Administrative Services officer of 2006 batch. He was kidnapped by Maoist rebels in Chhattisgarh state in 2012 and freed after 12 days of captivity. He is currently posted as labour commissioner & secretary, food and civil supplies under Chhattisgarh government.

Early life 
Alex Paul Menon was named after famous politician V. K. Krishna Menon by his father who was affiliated with Indian National Congress. Mr. Alex Menon did electronics engineering from Madurai Kamaraj University and earned a Master's degree in public policy.

Career 
Menon started his career in 2007 working at Govt of Chhattisgarh as an IAS officer.

Kidnap 
While he was attending the meeting, the rebels killed two security guards traveling with Menon and kidnapped him taking as a hostage. He was released from captivity on May 3, 2012. Menon is the first collector to have been abducted by the Maoists in Chhattisgarh.

References

External links 
 Official website

Year of birth missing (living people)
Living people